Philip F. Roach was a commodore in the United States Coast Guard.

Biography
Roach was born on February 11, 1881, in Sedalia, Colorado. He married Helen Bryan in 1939.

Career
Roach graduated from the Revenue Cutter Service School of Instruction in 1907. Afterwards, he was stationed in Boston, Massachusetts and Milwaukee, Wisconsin. Later, he was assigned to USRC Apache, USRC McCulloch, USRC Seminole and USRC Yamacraw. In 1917, he became executive officer of USRC Tampa.

During World War I, Roach commanded USCGC Manning and USS Lydonia. For his service, he was awarded the Navy Cross. Additionally, he received the World War I Victory Medal.

In 1921, he was assigned to USCGC Seneca. Roach was named executive officer of the USS Cassin in 1924 and later assumed command of the ship. After being stationed in Camden, New Jersey, he would command USCGC Modoc and USCGC Northland. In 1936, he became the first commanding officer of USCGC Duane.

References

People from Douglas County, Colorado
United States Coast Guard admirals
United States Revenue Cutter Service officers
Recipients of the Navy Cross (United States)
American military personnel of World War I
United States Coast Guard Academy alumni
1881 births
Year of death missing
Military personnel from Colorado